Weissella cibaria is a species of Gram-positive bacteria, placed within the family of Leuconostocaceae. W. cibaria CMGDEX3 was reported from Pakistan to produce high molecular weight, linear dextran with predominant (1→6) linkages.

References

Further reading

External links
List of species of the genus Weissella

Type strain of Weissella cibaria at BacDive -  the Bacterial Diversity Metadatabase

Weissella
Bacteria described in 2002